The Wilsons Peak Flora Reserve is a protected nature reserve that is located in the Northern Rivers region in the state of New South Wales, in eastern Australia. The reserve is bounded to the north by the border between New South Wales and the state of Queensland.

The dry rainforest is part of the Main Range group of the UNESCO World Heritagelisted Gondwana Rainforests of Australia. Significant plants in the area include Hoop Pine, Cliff Malletwood, Grevillea robusta and Muellerina myrtifolia.

See also

 Protected areas of New South Wales

References

External links
 
 
 
 

Forests of New South Wales
Flora reserves in New South Wales
Northern Rivers
Gondwana Rainforests of Australia